The transverse muscle of auricle (transverse auricular muscle, transversus auriculae, transversus auricularis or transverse muscle of pinna) is an intrinsic muscle of the outer ear.

The muscle is located on the cranial surface of the pinna. It consists of scattered fibers, partly tendinous and partly muscular, extending from the eminentia conchae to the prominence corresponding with the scapha.

While the muscle modifies the auricular shape only minimally in the majority of individuals, it could help flatten the cranial profile of the auricular cartilage.

The transverse muscle is developmentally derived from the second pharyngeal arch.

Additional images

See also
 Intrinsic muscles of external ear

References

External links
 AnatomyExpert.com

Ear
Muscles of the head and neck